The 1918–19 season saw Rochdale compete for their fourth season in the wartime football league, during World War I. Rochdale competed in the Lancashire section and finished 10th in the Principle Tournament and 3rd in the Subsidiary Tournament.

Statistics
	

|}

Competitions

Football League - Lancashire Section

References

Rochdale A.F.C. seasons
Rochdale